Sunblaze is a Progressive metal band from Germany. Their style is more specifically described as Progressive metal Orchestra. The band was founded in 1994. The EP Illuminating Heights was released in 1997. The band still exists today, but is currently inactive.

Music 
"Progressive metal Orchestra" is a suitable description for the band's style. The songs are versatile with many rhythm and mood changes. They contain the heaviness of a metal band as well as sounds of classical instruments (violin, clarinet, flute) and polyphonic choirs.

History 
The band was founded in Kaiserslautern/Germany in 1994. In autumn 1997, the band released their EP "Illuminating Heights" with two songs and a playing time of 25 minutes. The songs Sunblaze and Distant Reaches were recorded and produced in the band's own studio. The CD was well accepted by fans of progressive metal bands like Dream Theater or Fates Warning. Even though the band has no label and the CD is only available from mail order companies or the band, nearly 2000 CDs were sold.

Present 
The musicians have several songs ready for their second CD, but are currently not working on its completion.

Releases 
Illuminating Heights (1997)

External links
 www.sunblaze.de – official website
 Reviews – Several reviews of the CD Illuminating Heights

German progressive metal musical groups